Fabrizio Paghera (born 12 December 1991) is an Italian footballer who plays as a midfielder for Ternana.

Club career
Paghera made his first team Serie B debut on 24 October 2009 at the age of 17, during a league derby against AlbinoLeffe. Since then, he was regularly featured in the first team by head coach Giuseppe Iachini despite his youth.

He spent the 2010–11 season on loan to Lega Pro Prima Divisione club Verona, but made only thirteen appearances, never playing at all in the promotion playoffs that led his club back to Serie B.

Avellino
On 6 January 2016, Paghera signed with Avellino.

Ternana
On 10 January 2019, he signed with Ternana.

International career
Praghera has represented Italy at Under-19 level. He capped twice, both were friendlies.

References

External links
 Statistics at aic.football.it
 

Living people
1991 births
Footballers from Brescia
Association football midfielders
Italian footballers
Italy youth international footballers
Brescia Calcio players
Hellas Verona F.C. players
S.S. Virtus Lanciano 1924 players
U.S. Avellino 1912 players
F.C. Pro Vercelli 1892 players
Ternana Calcio players
Serie B players
Serie C players